The Libro de' Disegni (Italian for Book of Drawings) was a collection of drawings gathered, sorted and grouped by Giorgio Vasari whilst writing his Lives of the Most Excellent Painters, Sculptors, and Architects. By the time of his death in 1574 it is thought to have contained around 526 drawings, of which 162 are now in the Louvre and 83 in the Nationalmuseum, Stockholm. There are also drawings from the Libro in the prints and drawings departments of the Uffizi, the British Museum, the Albertina, the National Gallery of Art and other institutions.

Origins and dispersal
Some art historians believe they were gathered to illustrate Vasari's Lives directly, as a visual index of the artists' works, whilst others believe it was a separate document in its own right. In his preface to the Lives, Vasari described his reasons for writing:

No text reveals why Vasari compiled his collection of drawings, but it was probably to illustrate the styles of the different artists he wrote about and to show how he had divided them "into three parts, or rather let us call them periods, between the rebirth of the arts and our own time - each of these is distinguished from the others by manifest differences". The earliest drawing in the collection was by Cimabue and the latest dated to Vasari's own time. In the 1550 and 1568 editions of the Lives Vasari insisted on drawings as documents which allowed the viewer to perceive the maniera of the great masters of painting and mentioned when he owned one or two drawings by a particular artist, such as at the end of his life of Filippo Lippi:
("Fra Filippo drew very well, as one can see in my own Libro of the most famous painters, in the preparatory drawings for the altarpiece at Santo Spirito and the frescoes in the Prato chapel.") and in his life of Sandro Botticelli ("Sandro's drawings were of a totally unique excellence; and, after his death, more and more artists have been keen to have some of his drawings; and I myself, in my collection, have a few which were done with great care and judgement").

Giorgio Vasari was one of the founders of the Accademia delle Arti del Disegno set up in Florence by Cosimo I of Tuscany in 1563. He and the other founders wished to use this academy to promote artists above the status of artisans. He was also a passionate collector of drawings and in his Libro he set them in his own paper frames and gathered drawings by one or more painters on a single sheet. In 1528 he received a collection of Lorenzo Ghiberti's drawings, as one of Ghiberti's descendants.

After Vasari's death, the sheets of the Libro were initially bought in 1574 by the Florentine collector Niccolò Gaddi (1537-1591). They were then sold by Gaddi's heirs before 18 May 1638, the date of death of Lorenzo Sabbatini, who had been put in charge of the Libro. They were then dispersed among the Medici, Arundel, Quesnel, Crozat and Mariette collections during the 17th and 18th centuries.

Collections

European collections

Albertina

British Museum

Ecole des Beaux Arts

Louvre 
The first drawings from the Libro de' Disegni to enter the French national collection were bought by Everhard Jabach, probably when the Arundel collections were sold in 1646 and 1654 after his and his widow's deaths. They then passed from Jabach into Louis XIV's drawings collection in 1671. Further sheets from the Libro were added when the French royal collection bought part of the collection of Mariette in 1755 and when Saint-Morys's collection was seized by the revolutionary government in 1793. These later additions may have originated in the sale of the Crozat collection, for which a catalogue survives. Part of the Mariette collection was sold to the royal collection in 1775. Other pages entered the French national collection from émigré goods seized by the revolutionary government and via gift and purchase.

Munich

Stockholm
The museum acquired 83 drawings from the Libro as part of the Pierre Crozat and Carl Gustaf Tessin collections. They include Domenico Ghirlandaio's Head of an Old Man, a study for his 1490 painting An Old Man and his Grandson, now in the Louvre.

Uffizi

US collections

Metropolitan

National Gallery of Art

Yale

Notes

References

Bibliography
 Otto Kurz, Giorgio Vasari's Libro de'Disegni, Old Masters Drawings, 1937
 Arthur Ewart Popham, Drawings from the collection of Giorgio Vasari, British Museum Quarterly, 1936
 Per Bjurstrom, Italian Drawings from the Collection of Giorgio Vasari, National Museum, Stockholm, 2001 
 Andrew Morrogh, Vasari's Libro de' Disegni and Niccolò Gaddi's Collection of Drawings: The Work of Gaddi's "Chief Framer", conference paper at the RSA Annual Meeting, New York, NY, Hilton New York, 2014
  Stéfania Caliandro, Le Libro de' Disegni de Giorgio Vasari: un métatexte visuel, Presses universitaires de l'université de Limoges, 1999  Sample
  Giorgio Vasari, Les vies des meilleurs peintres, sculpteurs et architectes, édition commentée sous la direction d'André Chastel, Du texte à l'image. Dessins du "Libro", Berger-Levrault, Paris, 1989 
  Catherine Monbeig-Goguel, Giorgio Vasari : Dessinateur et collectionneur, XXXVIe exposition du Cabinet des dessins du musée du Louvre,  Réunion des musées nationaux, Paris, 1965
   Catherine Monbeig Goguel, Dessins italiens au musée du Louvre, deuxième moitié du XVIe siècle (artistes nés après 1500 et morts avant 1580). Vasari et son temps, Éditions des Musées nationaux, Paris, 1972 , présentation du livre : , École pratique des hautes études. 4e, Sciences historiques et philologiques, année 1972 (read online)
  Catherine Monbeig Goguel, Le dessin encadré, Revue de l'Art, année 1987, No. 76 (online)
  Alphonse Wyatt, Le Libro dei Disegni de Vasari, Gazette des beaux-arts, octobre-novembre-décembre 1859  (online)
  Licia Ragghianti Collobi, Il Libro de' Disegni del Vasari, Vallecchi, Florence, 1996

External links
 National Gallery of Art : Page from "Libro de' Disegni"
  Musée du Louvre - Département des Arts graphiques : Exposition : Giorgio Vasari : dessinateur et collectionneur. XXXVIe exposition du Cabinet des Dessins (1965)
  Base Joconde : Les 162 dessins de la collection de Vasari du cabinet des dessins

Renaissance art
Italian Renaissance
Italian culture-related lists
Arts-related lists
Collections of the National Gallery of Art
Drawings of the Louvre
Collections of the Nationalmuseum Stockholm
Collections of the Uffizi
Collections of the Albertina, Vienna
Prints and drawings in the British Museum
Giorgio Vasari